Gnoma suturifera is a species of beetle in the family Cerambycidae. It was described by Schwarzer in 1929. It is known from the Philippines.

Subspecies
 Gnoma suturifera fasciata Dillon & Dillon, 1950
 Gnoma suturifera suturifera Schwarzer, 1929

References

Lamiini
Beetles described in 1929